The Taunus is a mountain range in Hesse, Germany, located north west of Frankfurt and north of Wiesbaden. The tallest peak in the range is Großer Feldberg at 878 m; other notable peaks are Kleiner Feldberg (825 m) and Altkönig (798 m).

The Taunus range spans the districts of Hochtaunuskreis, Main-Taunus-Kreis, Rheingau-Taunus, Limburg-Weilburg, and Rhein-Lahn. The range is known for its geothermal springs and mineral waters that formerly attracted members of the European aristocracy to its spa towns. The car line Ford Taunus is named after it.

Description
It is a relatively low range, with smooth, rounded mountains covered with forest. The Taunus is bounded by the valleys of the Rhine, Main, and Lahn rivers and it is part of the Rhenish Slate Mountains. 
On the opposite side of the Rhine, The Taunus range is continued by the Hunsrück.

For geographical, ecological and geological purposes the Taunus is divided in three parts:
Anterior Taunus (Vortaunus or Vordertaunus) in the south, next to the cities of Frankfurt am Main and Wiesbaden. This section is mainly made up of old sedimentary rocks with phyllite, greenschist and muscovite. The rocks are often given a greenish hue by the presence of epidote and chlorites.
High Taunus (Hoher Taunus). The central region of the range where the highest peaks are found. Its geological composition includes slates, quartzite, and sandstones. 
Farther Taunus (Hintertaunus) at its northern end is the biggest section by area. The geological materials that compose it include graywacke, claystones, and siltstones.

The Taunus range originated during the Devonian period. The geological composition of the mountains was formed in a region covered by an ancient sea that was a few hundred kilometers wide. The mountains are mainly made up of phyllite, greenschist, gneiss, slates, and sandstone.

Summits 
 Großer Feldberg (878 m), Hochtaunuskreis (Kreis = district). Being the highest point in the range, it provides the scenario for the Feldbergrennen hillclimbing and rallying contests. It should not be confused with the Feldberg in the Black Forest
 Kleiner Feldberg (825 m), Hochtaunuskreis. It has an observatory on the summit.
 Altkönig (798 m), Hochtaunuskreis. It has the remains of a late Iron Age hill fort (La-Tène A, ca. 400 BC) near the summit.
 Weilsberg (701 m), Hochtaunuskreis
 Glaskopf (685 m), Hochtaunuskreis
 Pferdskopf (663 m), Hochtaunuskreis
 Kolbenberg (684 m; telecommunication facility), Hochtaunuskreis
 Klingenkopf (683 m), Hochtaunuskreis
 Sängelberg (665 m), Hochtaunuskreis
 Weißeberg (660 m), Hochtaunuskreis
 Fauleberg (633 m), Hochtaunuskreis
 Großer Eichwald (633 m), Hochtaunuskreis
 Roßkopf (632 m; telecommunication facility), Hochtaunuskreis
 Kalte Herberge (619 m), Rheingau-Taunus-Kreis
 Hohe Wurzel (618 m; telecommunication facility), Rheingau-Taunus-Kreis
 Hohe Kanzel (592 m), Rheingau-Taunus-Kreis
 Herzberg (591m), Hochtaunuskreis
 Hallgarter Zange (580 m), Rheingau-Taunus-Kreis
 Erbacher Kopf (580 m), Rheingau-Taunus-Kreis
 Steinkopf (Hochtaunuskreis) (570 m), Hochtaunuskreis
 Kuhbett (526 m), Kreis Limburg-Weilburg at Weilrod-Hasselbach
 Steinkopf (Wetteraukreis) (518 m), Wetteraukreis

History
The Roman Limes was built across the Taunus. The Saalburg, a restored Roman castellum, now houses a museum.

After the fall of the Limes (in 259/260 AD), the Alamanni settled in the range and for this reason there are some Alemannic cemeteries in the southern foothills of the Taunus (Eschborn). This area of the Taunus became part of the Frankish confederation of Germanic tribes after the Battle of Tolbiac around 500 AD.

In past centuries the Taunus became famous among aristocrats for its therapeutic hot springs.

Certain towns in the area, such as Bad Homburg vor der Höhe with its Kurpark, have geothermal spas that were formerly renowned. Other spa towns in the Taunus range are Bad Schwalbach (formerly Langenschwalbach) mentioned in documents dating back to the 16th century, Bad Ems, one of the most reputed therapeutic spas in Germany since the 17th century, as well as Bad Weilbach, where a spring reached wide fame for some time. By the 19th century the most famous spa towns in the area were Wiesbaden, Bad Homburg vor der Höhe, Bad Nauheim, and Bad Soden am Taunus.

Gallery

References

External links 
 

 
 Umweltatlas Hessen: → Natur und Landschaft → Die Naturräume Hessens bzw. Naturräumliche Gliederung – Naturraum-Haupteinheit 30 (Taunus), auf atlas.umwelt.hessen.de
 Fremdenverkehrsinformationen, Taunus Tourist Service at taunus.info
 Webcams at taunus.info
 Taunus Nature Park at naturpark-taunus.de
 Feldberg Roman Fort circular path, at feldbergkastell.de
 Summits in the Taunus by isolation and prominence, at thehighrisepages.de
 Wehrheim, das Tor zur Bronzezeit im Usinger Land , Infos zu archäologischen Funden in Wehrheim, auf geschichtsverein-usingen.de
 Das Vortaunusmuseum at vortaunusmuseum.de
  of the Taunus with boundaries, rivers and all important summits (Google Earth), at geographie.giersbeck.de#Taunus Placemarks

 
Regions of Hesse
Regions of Rhineland-Palatinate
Rhineland
Rhenish Massif
Mountain ranges of Hesse
Mountain ranges of Rhineland-Palatinate
Natural regions of the Central Uplands